Yusifcanlı is a village in the Aghdam District of Azerbaijan, 12km south-east of Aghdam City, on the right bank of the old course of the Gargarchay river. The village is on the cease-fire line between the armed forces of the self-proclaimed Nagorno-Karabakh Republic and those of Azerbaijan. There have been allegations of cease fire violations in the village's vicinity.

History 
After the end of the armed conflict in Nagorno-Karabakh, a ceasefire declaration was signed, under the terms of which the entire Aghdam region was returned to Azerbaijan on November 20, 2020.

References 

Populated places in Aghdam District